Peat, Smoke & Seaweed Storm is the second album of the Finnish composer Osmo Tapio Räihälä, released in 2014. The music on the album is performed by the Finnish Radio Symphony Orchestra, and two solo performers, the French horn player Jukka Harju and the pianist Matilda Kärkkäinen. The album consists of five works, written between 1999 and 2012. The opening track on the album, Barlinnie Nine, is a "musical portrait" of the Scottish ex-football player and Everton cult hero, Duncan Ferguson. The last track, Ardbeg (The Ultimate Piece for Orchestra) is a "musical landscape" of the Inner Hebrides island Islay, and an hommage to its single malt whisky tradition, and in particular Ardbeg.

Track listing

Personnel
Osmo Tapio Räihälä – composer, producer (all tracks)
Timo Ruottinen – executive producer (all tracks)
Sakari Oramo – conductor (1)
Dima Slobodeniouk – conductor (3, 5)
Jukka Harju – French horn (2)
Matilda Kärkkäinen – piano (4)

Media reception
Peat, Smoke & Seaweed Storm received positive reviews in the music media, and is so far Räihälä's major critical success. For example, the Gramophone magazine stated that "This is a well-recorded disc of attractive music, well worth investigating".

In 2015, Peat, Smoke & Seaweed Storm was nominated for the Independent Music Awards for the best Contemporary Classical album award.

Notes
According to the sleeve notes, the tracks 1 (Barlinnie Nine) and 3 (Iron Rain) are live concert recordings, whereas the rest are studio recordings.

References

2014 albums
Osmo Tapio Räihälä albums
Instrumental albums
Contemporary classical music albums